Katherine Neel Dale was an American medical missionary of the Associate Reformed Presbyterian Church who served in Mexico; primarily in the states of San Luis Potosí and Tamaulipas, specifically Rio Verde and Tampico regions. Katherine and her husband, James G. Dale, served the Mexican people for over forty years, where she built up an extended practice (treating up to 18,500 patients per year), founded and built Dale Memorial Hospital, and founded the Mexican Indian Mission - which included schools for Indian girls and boys.

Early life and family
Katherine was born on August 13, 1872, in Troy, South Carolina,  the daughter of James Dale and Margaret Pressly Neel and the youngest of five siblings.

Family of Physicians 
Dale's grandfather, Dr. George Pressly, was a noted physician of his day, as well as a pillar in the Associate Reformed Presbyterian Church (A.R.P) Church of Cedar Springs, South Carolina. Her father, uncle, brother, and cousins were also physicians. A cousin, Dr. George Presley Neel, was for many years a prominent physician at Greenwood, South Carolina - he died in 1939 at age 73 in Troy, South Carolina,.

Family members in missionary and church roles 
Dale's oldest sibling, Mrs. Emma Kennedy, died at Cedar Springs, South Carolina, in 1939. Her daughter, Miss Mary Kennedy, was a missionary of the Associate Reformed Presbyterian Church in India. Dale's second sibling, Mrs. Belle Neel Bonner, was wife of the Rev. O. Y. Bonner, a pastor of the Associate Reformed  Presbyterian Church at Due West, South Carolina, died in 1901 at age 33.  Miss Lavinia Neel, for many years a missionary of the Associate Reformed Presbyterian Church in Mexico, laboring first at Ciudad del Maiz and later at Rio Verde and Tampico. She died on August 11, 1930 (aged 60) in Atlanta, DeKalb County, Georgia, USA. and was buried in Troy Cemetery located in Greenwood County, South Carolina, USA.

Marriage and Children 
After a year and a half after opening her clinic in Ciudad del Maiz, Katherine Neel was married to the Rev. J. G. Dale, missionary to the same field, who was that time studying the language in Rio Verde, San Louis Potosi. Katherine had five children with James G. Dale: Jesse Miller (1901-1980), Belle Bonner Dale (1902-1996), Rev. John Taylor Dale (1906-1998), Margaret Pressly Dale (1910-1993). All of Katherine's children were deemed very bright. In 1927, Belle was in her second year of medicine at the University of Virginia. Margaret was a sophomore in Women's College and John was a senior in Erskine College located in Du Point.

Education 
Since a young age, Katherine's keen for academic learning was evident, she was on the honor roll for both middle school and high school. At the age of fourteen years, she was brought to Christ and identified herself with the Church of her fathers at Troy, S.C. Her primary education was received in the schools near her home, and she graduated from Due West Female College, Due West, S.C. in 1892. The following year, she dedicated her life and work to the service of God in a foreign field and by the Board she was appointed to the Mexican field. As a result, Katherine then took a full course at the Women's Medical College, Philadelphia, Pa. and graduated in 1807. She spent one year as Resident Physician in the hospital of same institution.

Missionary Service

Missionary Calling 

Dr. J. S. Moffatt, pastor of the Associate Reformed Presbyterian Church of Chester, South Carolina, directed a week of services as a visiting pastor. Faculty and students of the Female College were invited to join in the union meetings. At the close of the week Dr. Moffatt had left and Dr. W. W. Orr, the synodical evangelist, came and conducted the closing service of the series. In his message he brought to the students of both colleges a vision of the white harvest fields waiting for the gospel reapers to go and gather the harvest which for so long had been ripe and ready. He called for volunteers for the world evangelization. Katherine felt the Holy Spirit manifest her and call her duty to be a missionary and spread the word of God. Besides Katherine, about fifty young men and women were called and volunteered for a foreign mission field. Dale's pledge that night reads:

Missionary Work in Mexico 
In 1893, Dale was appointed by the Missions Board to the Mexican Mission. She went to Ciudad del Maiz, San Luis Potosí, Mexico as a medical missionary of the Associate Reformed Presbyterian Church in 1898 where she would later meet and marry her husband. She, with her spouse, primarily worked in Rio Verde area in San Luis Potosí where the hospital was built for the next 14 years. In April 1919, the Board of Foreign Missions directed the Dales to return to the mission field in Rio Verde. It was said that conditions had greatly improved after bandit forces roamed the city. However, as the Dales reached the Dale Memorial Hospital, it had been looted and all the furniture, medicines, and medical instruments taken away. In view of this, the Board decided to send them to Tampico to take over the field of which that city was the center. Following a furlough in the U.S., Dr. Dale returned to Tampico, Mexico in 1919 and practiced for 11 years both as religious missionary as part of the Associate Reformed Presbyterian Church and as a medical missionary. In 1925, December 5, James G. Dale and Katherine returned from a five months vacation spent in the mountains of North Carolina, the first vacation they had after 6 years as Presbyterian missionaries.  In 1930, Dale went to Tamazunchale, where she continued her clinical practice and orchestrated the Mexican Indian Mission until her death in 1941.

Rio Verde 
In 1900 the Board of Foreign Missions sent the Dales to open a mission in Cerritos, a town in the state of San Luis Potosí, on the railroad from Tampico to San Luis Potosí. The following year the Mission and the Board decided to establish in Rio Verde an institution for the education of young men of the field, and for the training of men for the ministry where the Dale Family.

Dale Memorial Hospital 
Five years after opening her work in Rio Verde, the Dale family of Oak Hill, Alabama, gave Dr. Dale the necessary funds to build a hospital. The building was named the Dale Memorial Hospital, in memory of William and Mary Dale, members of the Associate Reformed Presbyterian Church of Oak Hill, Alabama. It was a two-story building made of Mexican adobe or brick, costing three thousand Mexican dollars. It furnished Dr Dale with two offices, an operating room, a large waiting room for the clinic, three rooms for private patients, a large ward, a dining room and kitchen.

Mexican Indian Mission

Recruitment 

The Mexican Indian Mission, with which Dr. Dale was connected, is an interdenominational work, supported solely by prayer and operated similarly to the China Inland Mission. The Pioneer Mission Agency of Philadelphia, Pennsylvania, of which the late Dr. Charles Cuthbert Trumbull was chairman, sponsor the work but offered no financial support. The mission looked to God to supply all its needs. Missionary operations were opened at Tamazunchale, especially the Totonaca country, and from this center the mission sought to evangelize the Aztecs. The Pioneer Mission Agency found that their charter would not permit them to send missionaries, but they helped Katherine and James to form a Home Council which has to do with the selection of new missionaries and all other matters pertaining to the direction of the work. Dr. R.C. McQuilkin, President of Columbia Bible College, South Carolina.

School for Girls 
Katherine would open a dormitory under the care and supervision of Christian women missionaries where the Mission would give the Indian girls room and board. The girls would attend the public school of the town. In the dormitory they would study the Bible, hygiene, cooking, and the preparation of a more balanced diet. The dormitory was a training camp where the Indian girls would be prepared mentally, socially, and spiritually, to establish Christian ideologies. The girls' dormitory was opened in Tamazunchale in 1940 with eighteen girls selected from representative Indian congregations. The following year there were twenty-one Indian congregations, and then in 1942 twenty-six. Katherine loved to teach and speak the word of God. One of the women missionaries, Mrs. R. L. Robinson, who would become editor of the Journal of Missions of the Associate Reformed Presbyterian Church, wrote the following as part of an editorial about Dr. Dale:

Death and Burial 
Katherine Neel Dale died on May 28, 1941, at age 68 in San Antonio, Texas. She was buried in Bethel Associate Reformed Presbyterian Church Cemetery in Oak Hill, Wilcox County, Alabama.

References 

Christian medical missionaries
Missionary educators
1872 births
1941 deaths
American Presbyterian missionaries
Presbyterian missionaries in Mexico
American expatriates in Mexico
Female Christian missionaries
People from Greenwood County, South Carolina